Lambretta can refer to:

 Lambretta, a petrol-powered scooter made by Innocenti
 Lambretta (band), a Swedish rock band
 The Lambrettas, a British mod revival band
 The Lambretta, an Italian term for the football trick called the "rainbow kick"